Lupine may be one of several things:

Something that is like, or relating to, a wolf (Canis lupus).
Lupinus, a genus of flowering plants
Lu Pine Records, a record label in Detroit.

See also
 Lupin (disambiguation)